Take Heart may refer to:
 Take Heart (Juice Newton album), 1979
 Take Heart (The Sam Willows album), 2015